"Don't Say Nothin' Bad (About My Baby)" is a 1963 song written by Gerry Goffin and Carole King for the girl group the Cookies. It was the group's most successful single and their only one to reach the top ten on the U.S. singles charts.

Critic Richie Unterberger, in a song review for AllMusic, noted:

The single peaked at number seven on the Billboard Hot 100, number three on the Billboard R&B Singles charts in 1963, and #17 in #Canada. Billboard ranked the song at number 86 on its list of 100 Greatest Girl Group Songs of All Time.

References

Songs written by Carole King
Songs with lyrics by Gerry Goffin
1963 songs
1963 singles
Dimension Records singles
The Cookies songs